Vladimiro Etson António Félix (born 24 April 1998), commonly known as Vá, is an Angolan professional footballer who plays as a forward for Apollon Limassol.

In 2018–19, he signed in for Petro de Luanda.

International career 
At the youth level he played in the 2016 COSAFA U-20 Cup.

International goals
Scores and results list Angola's goal tally first.

References

External links

1998 births
Living people
Angolan footballers
Angola international footballers
Angola under-20 international footballers
Atlético Petróleos de Luanda players
Leixões S.C. players
Progresso Associação do Sambizanga players
Girabola players
Association football forwards
Angola A' international footballers
2018 African Nations Championship players
Angolan expatriate sportspeople in Cyprus
Angolan expatriate sportspeople in Portugal
Angolan expatriate footballers
Expatriate footballers in Cyprus
Expatriate footballers in Portugal
Pafos FC players
Apollon Limassol FC players